Armeria is a genus of flowering plants.  These plants are sometimes known as "lady's cushion", "thrift", or "sea pink" (the latter because as they are often found on coastlines).  The genus counts over a hundred species, mostly native to the Mediterranean, although Armeria maritima is an exception, being distributed along the coasts of the Northern Hemisphere, including Ireland, parts of the United Kingdom such as Cornwall, and the Pembrokeshire Coast National Park in Wales.

Some are popular with gardeners as rockery plants.

 Some species and subspecies
Armeria alliacea 
Armeria alpina 
Armeria arenaria 
Armeria berlengensis
Armeria caespitosa 
Armeria cariensis
Armeria duriaei
Armeria gaditana
Armeria girardii
Armeria juniperifolia
Armeria leucocephala
Armeria maritima (sea thrift, sea cushion, sea pink)
A. maritima subsp. andina
A. maritima subsp. californica
A. maritima subsp. elongata
A. maritima subsp. maritima
A. maritima subsp. sibirica
Armeria nebrodensis
Armeria pinifolia  
Armeria pseudarmeria 
Armeria pubigera
Armeria pungens 
Armeria rumelica 
Armeria sardoa 
Armeria splendens 
Armeria undulata 
Armeria villosa 
Armeria villosa subsp. longearistata 
Armeria villosa subsp. villosa 
Armeria welwitschii

References

Bibliography 

 

 
Caryophyllales genera